Archie's Holiday Fun Digest was an annual holiday-themed comics collection for Archie Comics, issued as part of the Archie Digest Library.

The book revolves around the Christmas season and draws on typical situations of that time of year, from what to buy for everyone, snow removal, parties, caroling and such.  Usually there is some money problems like the gang not having enough money for all of their gifts or Betty teaching Veronica the real reason of the season. 

There are some religious stories as well such as Betty and Veronica attending church or creating religious cards for their friends. 

Usually at the end of the digest are various pin up pages with various messages that relate to the season such as "Merry Christmas" or "Happy Holidays".

After 2007, the 12th annual issue the title didn't return the following year for unknown reasons.  Instead a holiday themed issue of the long running Archie Digest title has been printed.

Archie Comics titles
Comic book digests
Comics anthologies
1995 comics debuts
Teen comedy comics
Romantic comedy comics